James Alison (11 October 1923 – February 1998) was a Scottish footballer, who played as a wing half in the Football League for Manchester City and Aldershot.

References

1923 births
1998 deaths
People from Peebles
Association football wing halves
Scottish footballers
Peebles Rovers F.C. players
Falkirk F.C. players
Manchester City F.C. players
Aldershot F.C. players
Weymouth F.C. players
Scottish Football League players
English Football League players